Denis Grot (born 6 January 1984) is a former Belarusian professional ice hockey player who last played for Toros Neftekamsk in the Supreme Hockey League (VHL). He was selected by Vancouver Canucks in the 2nd round (55th overall) of the 2002 NHL Entry Draft.

Career statistics

Regular season and playoffs

International

External links

1984 births
Living people
Ice hockey people from Minsk
Amur Khabarovsk players
Avtomobilist Yekaterinburg players
Belarusian ice hockey players
HC Neftekhimik Nizhnekamsk players
HC Sarov players
HC Sibir Novosibirsk players
HC Spartak Moscow players
HC Yugra players
Lokomotiv Yaroslavl players
Russian ice hockey defencemen
Toros Neftekamsk players
Torpedo Nizhny Novgorod players
Vancouver Canucks draft picks